Alkaline phosphatase, tissue-nonspecific isozyme is an enzyme that in humans is encoded by the ALPL gene.

Function 

There are at least four distinct but related alkaline phosphatases: intestinal, placental, placental-like, and liver/bone/kidney (tissue-nonspecific). The first three are located together on chromosome 2, whereas the tissue-nonspecific form is located on chromosome 1. The product of this gene is a membrane-bound glycosylated enzyme that is not expressed in any particular tissue and is, therefore, referred to as the tissue-nonspecific form of the enzyme. The exact physiological function of the alkaline phosphatases is not known. A proposed function of this form of the enzyme is matrix mineralization. However, mice that lack a functional form of this enzyme show normal skeletal development.

Clinical significance 

This enzyme has been linked directly to a disorder known as hypophosphatasia, a disorder that is characterized by low serum ALP and undermineralised bone (osteomalacia). The character of this disorder can vary, however, depending on the specific mutation, since this determines age of onset and severity of symptoms.

The severity of symptoms ranges from premature loss of deciduous teeth with no bone abnormalities to stillbirth depending upon which amino acid is changed in the ALPL gene. Mutations in the ALPL gene lead to varying low activity of the enzyme tissue-nonspecific alkaline phosphatase (TNSALP) resulting in hypophosphatasia (HPP). There are different clinical forms of HPP which can be inherited by an autosomal recessive trait or autosomal dominant trait, the former causing more severe forms of the disease. Alkaline phosphatase allows for mineralization of calcium and phosphorus by bones and teeth. ALPL gene mutation leads to insufficient TNSALP enzyme and allows for an accumulation of chemicals such as inorganic pyrophosphate to indirectly cause elevated calcium levels in the body and lack of bone calcification.  

The mutation E174K, where a glycine is converted to an alanine amino acid at the 571st position of its respective polypeptide chain, is a result of an ancestral mutation that occurred in Caucasians and shows a mild form of HPP.

References

Further reading

External links 
 GeneReviews/NCBI/NIH/UW entry on Hypophosphatasia
 

Enzymes